Rocco Chinnici (19 January 1925 – 29 July 1983) was a noted Italian anti-Mafia magistrate killed by the Sicilian Mafia.

Life
Born at Misilmeri, Chinnici graduated in law at the University of Palermo in 1947 and started working as a magistrate in 1952 in Trapani. In 1966 he moved to the prosecutors office in Palermo. In November 1979, he became head of the Examining Office at the Palermo Court, following the murder of his predecessor, Cesare Terranova, by the Mafia. At the time the prosecution was separated in an examining phase (the so-called instruction phase) and a prosecuting phase.

Chinnici created the Antimafia Pool, a group of investigating magistrates who closely worked together sharing information to diffuse responsibility and to prevent one person from becoming the sole institutional memory and solitary target. The Antimafia pool laid the groundwork for the Maxi Trial against the Sicilian Mafia in 1986.

He was instrumental in reviving investigations into the Mafia and understood the need to bridge the gap between the judiciary and the rest of Sicilian society to create a counterculture against the Mafia and break down omertà, the law of silence that kept the Mafia alive. He frequently spoke out against the Mafia in public appearances and schools at a time when judges had avoided the word for many years.

Assassination

On 29 July 1983 a car bomb explosion in Palermo killed Chinnici, two of his bodyguards, Mario Trapassi and Salvatore Bartolotta, and the concierge of his apartment block, Stefano Li Sacchi, as he left the house to go to work. The bomb was triggered by the notorious Mafia assassin Pino Greco, on the orders of his uncle Michele Greco. In 2002, Bernardo Provenzano, Salvatore Riina, Raffaele Ganci, Antonino Madonia, Salvatore Buscemi, Nenè Geraci, Giuseppe Calò, Francesco Madonia, Salvatore and Giuseppe Montalto, Stefano Ganci and Vincenzo Galatolo were sentenced in absentia to life imprisonment for ordering the murder of Chinnici. 
He was succeeded as Chief Prosecutor by Antonino Caponnetto.

Biography

See also
Caterina Chinnici
List of victims of the Sicilian Mafia
Il Capo dei Capi
Carlo Alberto Dalla Chiesa

References

Schneider, Jane T. & Peter T. Schneider (2003). Reversible Destiny: Mafia, Antimafia, and the Struggle for Palermo, Berkeley: University of California Press 
Stille, Alexander (1995). Excellent Cadavers: The Mafia and the Death of the First Italian Republic, New York: Vintage

External links
 Fondazione Rocco Chinnici
 La rivolta dei giudici Siciliani: Intervista al Giudice Rocco Chinnici, I Siciliani, March 1983

1925 births
1983 deaths
People from the Province of Palermo
Antimafia
Deaths by car bomb in Italy
People murdered by the Sicilian Mafia
Law enforcement in Italy
Assassinated Italian judges
People murdered in Italy
University of Palermo alumni
1983 murders in Italy
People murdered by the Corleonesi